Baladiyah al-Rawdah, officially the Al-Rawdah Sub-Municipality is a baladiyah and one of the 14 sub-municipalities of Riyadh, Saudi Arabia, which includes 18 neighborhoods and districts, including al-Rawdah, and is responsible for their maintenance, planning and development.

Neighborhoods and districts 

 Al Rawdah 
 Al Andalus
 King Faisal District
 Al-Quds
 Al Hamra
 Ash-Shuhada
 Al-Ghirnatah
 Al-Qurtubah
 Al-Munsiyah
 Al-Yarmuk
 Ishbiliyah
 Al-Khaleej
 Al-Nahadhah
 Al-Maizilah
 Al-Qadisiyyah
 Al-Rimal
 Al-Janadariyah

References

Baladiyahs of Riyadh
Economy of Riyadh